World Series of Fighting 17: Shields vs. Foster was a mixed martial arts event held  in Las Vegas, Nevada, United States. This event aired on NBCSN in the U.S and on TSN2 in Canada.

Background
The main event was a fight between former Strikeforce Middleweight Champion Jake Shields and Brian Foster.

Results

See also 
 World Series of Fighting
 List of WSOF champions
 List of WSOF events

References

World Series of Fighting events
2015 in mixed martial arts
Mixed martial arts in Las Vegas